Gorontalo is a regency of Gorontalo Province, Indonesia, on the island of Sulawesi. It was established in 1959 under Law Number (Undang-Undang Nomor) 29/1959, but has subsequently been reduced in area as additional regencies have been cut out of it. It now has an area of 2,125.47 km2 and had a population of 355,988 at the 2010 Census and 393,107 at the 2020 Census; the official estimate as at mid 2021 was 395,635. The administrative headquarters of the regency is in the town of Limboto.

Administrative Districts 
At the time of the 2010 Census the Regency was divided into seventeen districts (kecamatan), but two additional districts (Dungaliyo and Bilato) have subsequently been created by splitting of existing districts. The districts are tabulated below with their areas and their populations at the 2010 Census and 2020 Census, together with the official estimates as at mid 2021. The table also includes the locations of the district administrative centres, the number of administrative villages (rural desa and urban kelurahan) in each district, and its postal codes.

Notes: (a) the 2010 population of the new Dungaliyo District is included in the figure for the existing Bongomeme District, from which it was cut out. (b) the 2010 population of the new Bilato District is included in the figure for the existing Boliyohuto District, from which it was cut out. (c) Tilango and Talaga Jaya Districts are western suburbs of Gorontalo city.

Towns and villages
 

Atinggola

References

External links 

 

Regencies of Gorontalo